Kvinnens plass (A Woman's Place) is a Norwegian drama film from 1956 directed by Nils R. Müller. The script was written by Müller and Eva Seeberg.

Plot
The journalist Tore Haugen returns to Norway from the United States. He falls in love with the journalist Tore Næss and soon discovers that he has a job with the same newspaper as her. Næss shows outstanding qualities and develops into a star reporter, whereas Haugen is mediocre. When they have children together, the question arises which of them will sacrifice their career to be at home with the child. Haugen soon finds himself comfortable in the role of a stay-at-home father.

Cast

Lars Nordrum as Tore Haugen
Inger Marie Andersen as Tore Ness
Harald Aimarsen as a newspaper employee
Haakon Arnold 		
Pål Bang-Hansen as a newspaper employee	
Odd Borg as Per, a journalist
Wilfred Breistrand as an editorial staff member	
Hilde Brenni 		
Lalla Carlsen as the boardinghouse operator
Kari Diesen 		
Oscar Egede-Nissen as a man that saw a UFO
Helge Essmar as the director's secretary
Jack Fjeldstad as the insurance agent
Dan Fosse as a man that saw a UFO
Hilde Grythe as Tore and Tore's child
Turid Haaland as the mother
Knut M. Hansson as a newspaper employee	
Willie Hoel as Teodor
Ella Hval as Mrs. Steffensen
Mette Lange-Nielsen 		
Erik Lassen as a newspaper employee
Per Lillo-Stenberg as a newspaper employee
Erling Lindahl as an editorial staff member	 		
Fridtjof Mjøen as the editor
Kari Neegård 		
Siri Rom as a waitress
Aud Schønemann as Miss Stjernhol
Erna Schøyen 		
Eugen Skjønberg 		
Rolf Søder as a man that saw a UFO
Kirsten Sørlie

References

External links
 
 Kvinnens plass at the National Library of Norway

1956 films
Norwegian drama films
Norwegian black-and-white films
1956 drama films
Films directed by Nils R. Müller